Classic is the second studio album by British singer Joe McElderry. It was released by Decca Records on 19 August 2011 in Ireland and on 22 August 2011 in the United Kingdom. Signed copies were available to pre-order on Universal Music's online store.

Background and production
After his contract with Syco expired, and winning a second TV show Popstar to Operastar, McElderry confirmed that he would be recording his second studio album, stating, "It's not going to be pop, it's going to be a lot of big, lush ballads. I wanted to do a few more ballads on my first album. It's going to appeal to all my fans. I'm going to sing a few Italian songs. I'm not going to change my voice – I don't want to scare people too much... I can't reveal which label it's with but it's an amazing label.
The label was later revealed to be Decca Records. In a blog, McElderry described the album by talking about the title saying "The album is called Classic, it's classic songs, it's a classic repertoire, it's songs that everybody will know. We're kind of bringing it in and matching it to my style of my voice, but also touching a bit on the classical side as well, so it's all round a classic album". Describing the process of recording the album with a new label, saying "We're doing it quite quickly this time round, it's good to just go with the flow and just get it done and let all the creative emotions flow out very fast. It's really nice to get the experience of working with a different label that has a different kind of view on things. I've just enjoyed kind of getting in there, throwing myself into the deep end and just totally going for it."

McElderry has stated that he recorded the album in six days.

During the first half of August, McElderry did a radio tour, visiting various radio stations around the country to promote the album. "Dance with My Father" and "Over the Rainbow" received their first play during this time.

"She was Beautiful" was released as a free download through his official newsletter.

"Hear My Prayer" is an English version of "Nessun dorma" written specially for McElderry; the original Italian version is included as a bonus track.

McElderry performed on QVC on 18 August.

A music video was filmed for "Time to Say Goodbye", the video was filmed in Hackney on 8 August 2011, during the 2011 England riots. The music video was released on 22 August, the album's release date.

A stripped live performance was used as the music video for "Dance with My Father". The video premiered on Entertainment Focus on 13 September 2011.

A third music video was made for "Solitaire". The video features behind the scenes footage and a performance shot from where the "Dance with My Father" video was filmed, this time though, the video is in black and white.

Reception
{{Album ratings
| rev1 = AllMusic
| rev1Score =
| rev2 = Entertainment Focus
| rev2Score = 
| rev3 = Heat
| rev3Score =<ref>'Heat magazine: issue 643. Retrieved on 23 August 2011.</ref>
}}
On 15 August 2011, Shields Gazette praised the album, saying "the balladeer is back and, with every listen, Classic gets better and better!." Jamie Tabberer of Gay Times also praised the album, saying "A year on from his massively underrated debut Wide Awake and fresh from Popstar to Operastar victory Joe's poised to release his sophomore effort. It's an album that does exactly what it says on the tin; a sophisticated, meticulously chosen collection of classic, classy, emotive anthems." Heat magazine gave the album 4/5 stars, saying "Joe's debut Wide Awake may have been one of the most underrated pop albums ever, but after his storming victory on PTO, he has turned his talents to singing rousing opera tunes- and crikey, does that boy have a voice."Classic entered at number two in the UK. Within 10 days after the release, the album received a gold certification.  On 7 September 2011, during an appearance on the Alan Titchmarsh Show which was broadcast the following day, McElderry was presented with his official gold disc by his grandmother, Hilda Joyce.

Tour

Track listing

Chart performanceClassic entered the UK Albums Chart at number 2, with retail sales of 35,609 copies in the country during the album's first week of release.  During the album's second week of release, 31,001 copies were sold in the United Kingdom, and the album landed at number 5 on the chart. The album climbed two spaces to number 3 in its third week of release, selling 29,736 copies in that week. In its fourth week of release, the album dropped two positions back to number 5 on the chart, but 22,835 copies of the album were sold at retail in the United Kingdom that week, thereby putting the album over the 100,000 retail sales mark in the country.  The album moved up one position to number 4 on the chart in its fifth week of release.  It fell to number 9 in its sixth week of release, and then exited the top 10 the following week, landing at number 14 at the end of its seventh week of release.

As stated above, the album received a gold certification from the British Phonographic Industry within ten days after its release.  The threshold for a gold certification from the BPI is 100,000 copies sold by the label to British retailers. As January 2016, the album has sold over 250,000 copies in the UK.

On the Irish Albums Chart, Classic debuted at number 48 after its first week of release. In its second week on the chart, the album moved up ten positions to number 38. In its third week of release, the album moved up one more position to number 37. The album dropped back one position to number 38 in its fourth week of release, and fell to number 54 in its fifth week of release. The following week, after an appearance by McElderry on The Late Late Show'' in Ireland on 23 September 2011, the album moved up to number 20, its peak position on the chart.  It then fell to number 23 in its seventh week of release, to number 33 in its eighth week of release, to number 46 in its ninth week of release, and to number 75 in its tenth week of release.

Charts

Weekly charts

Year-end charts

Personnel

Joe McElderry – Vocals
City of Prague Philharmonic Orchestra – Orchestra
Brighton Festival Chorus – Choir
James Morgan – Conductor, Producer, Mixing, Editing, Orchestral arrangements and programming, Keyboards (2, 6, 7, 10-12)
Juliette Pochin – Producer, Mixing, Editing, Orchestral arrangements and programming, Keyboards (2, 6, 7, 10-12)
Steven Baker – Orchestral arrangements and programming (1, 3-5, 8, 9), Producer (1, 3-5, 8, 9)
Nicholas Dodd – Orchestral arrangements and programming (1, 3-5, 8, 9)
Richard Hein – Conductor (1, 3-5, 8, 9)
Craig Hendry – Bass guitar (1, 3-5, 8, 9)
Per Lindvall – Drums
Alan Thomas – Guitar (2, 6, 7, 10-12)
Friðrik Karlsson – Guitar 
Miloš Karadaglić – Solo Guitar (2, 6, 7, 10-12)
Nick Browning – Ukulele (1, 3-5, 8, 9)

Release history

References

2011 albums
Joe McElderry albums
Covers albums